German submarine U-467 was a Type VIIC U-boat of Nazi Germany's Kriegsmarine during World War II.

She carried out two patrols. She sank no ships.

She was a member of one wolfpack.

She was sunk by a US Navy aircraft southeast of Iceland on 25 May 1943.

Design
German Type VIIC submarines were preceded by the shorter Type VIIB submarines. U-467 had a displacement of  when at the surface and  while submerged. She had two shafts and two  propellers.

U-467 was fitted with five  torpedo tubes (four fitted at the bow and one at the stern), fourteen torpedoes, one  SK C/35 naval gun, 220 rounds, and one twin  C/30 anti-aircraft gun. The boat had a complement of between forty-four and sixty.

Service history
The submarine was laid down on 22 June 1941 at Deutsche Werke in Kiel as yard number 298, launched on 16 May 1942 and commissioned on 15 July under the command of Kapitänleutnant Heinz Kummer.

She served with the 5th U-boat Flotilla from 15 July 1942 for training and the 11th flotilla from 1 April 1943 for operations.

First patrol
U-432s first patrol was preceded by a short journey from Kiel in Germany to Bergen in Norway. The patrol itself began when the boat departed Bergen on 27 March 1943. She headed northwest into the Norwegian Sea.

Second patrol and loss
Her second foray began with her departure from Bergen on 20 May 1943. On the 25th, she was sunk by a FIDO homing torpedo dropped by a US Navy Catalina flying boat from VP-84.

Forty-six men went down with U-467; there were no survivors.

Wolfpacks
U-467 took part in one wolfpack, namely:
 Eisbär (30 March – 15 April 1943)

References

Bibliography

External links

German Type VIIC submarines
U-boats commissioned in 1942
U-boats sunk in 1943
U-boats sunk by US aircraft
1942 ships
Ships built in Kiel
Ships lost with all hands
World War II submarines of Germany
World War II shipwrecks in the Atlantic Ocean
Maritime incidents in May 1943